Lewis Baxter is a professional rugby league footballer who plays as a  or  for St Helens (Heritage № 1274) in the Betfred Super League.

Baxter made his first team début for Saints in April 2022 against the Castleford Tigers.

References

External links
St Helens profile
Saints Heritage Society profile

2002 births
Living people
English rugby league players
Rugby league props
Rugby league second-rows
St Helens R.F.C. players